Mohammad Hadi Mahdavikia is an Iranian football coach and former player who is currently the coach of KIA Football Academy. 

In July 2001, he was transferred from Persepolis to Hamburger SV to play for its amateure team. However, he was injured in August and did not play any matches.

He is the younger brother of Mehdi Mahdavikia.

Honours 
Persepolis
Azadegan League (2): 1998–1999, 1999–2000
Hazfi Cup: 1998–1999
Hamburger SV Amateure
Oberliga Hamburg/Schleswig-Holstein: 2001–2002
Saipa
Persian Gulf Pro League: 2006–2007

References

 Profile at FC KIA

Iranian footballers
Persepolis F.C. players
Living people
1979 births
Hamburger SV II players
Iranian expatriate footballers
People from Tehran
Saipa F.C. players
Association football midfielders